Rancho Tehama, also known as the Rancho Tehama Reserve, is an unincorporated community in Tehama County, California, United States.  As of the 2020 census, the population of the community and nearby areas was 1,572.  The lightly populated rural, remote community has large lots where some residents farm olives, walnuts and almonds.

History

2017 shooting spree 

During a shooting spree on November 13-14, five people were killed and eighteen others were injured at eight separate crime scenes, including an elementary school. Ten people suffered bullet wounds and eight were cut by flying glass caused by the gunfire. The gunman, Kevin Janson Neal, died by suicide after a Corning police officer rammed and stopped his stolen vehicle.

Geography 
The census definition of the area may not precisely correspond to local understanding of the area with the same name.

Demographics 

For statistical purposes, the United States Census Bureau has defined Rancho Tehama Reserve as a census-designated place (CDP), which includes population from the surrounding area.

2010 
At the 2010 census Rancho Tehama had a population of 1,485, an increase from the population of 1,406 recorded in the 2000 census. The racial makeup of Rancho Tehama was 1,181 (79.5%) White, 21 (1.4%) African American, 52 (3.5%) Native American, 21 (1.4%) Asian, 5 (0.3%) Pacific Islander, 102 (6.9%) from other races, and 103 (6.9%) from two or more races. Hispanic or Latino of any race were 214 people (14.4%).

The whole population lived in households, no one lived in non-institutionalized group quarters and no one was institutionalized.

There were 587 households, 143 (24.4%) had children under the age of 18 living in them, 289 (49.2%) were married couples, 63 (10.7%) had a female householder with no husband present, 42 (7.2%) had a male householder with no wife present.  There were 37 (6.3%) unmarried opposite-sex partnerships, and 1 (0.2%) same-sex married couples or partnerships. 148 households (25.2%) were one person and 57 (9.7%) had someone living alone who was 65 or older. The average household size was 2.53.  There were 394 families (67.1% of households); the average family size was 2.96.

The age distribution was 295 people (19.9%) under the age of 18, 110 people (7.4%) aged 18 to 24, 253 people (17.0%) aged 25 to 44, 509 people (34.3%) aged 45 to 64, and 318 people (21.4%) who were 65 or older.  The median age was 48.5 years. For every 100 females, there were 100.4 males.  For every 100 females age 18 and over, there were 102.7 males.

There were 776 housing units at an average density of 66.2 per square mile, of the occupied units 476 (81.1%) were owner-occupied and 111 (18.9%) were rented. The homeowner vacancy rate was 6.5%; the rental vacancy rate was 6.7%.  1,150 people (77.4% of the population) lived in owner-occupied housing units and 335 people (22.6%) lived in rental housing units.

Government 

References

External links 

 
 The rural US town where police refuse calls - The Guardian - March 16, 2023

Census-designated places in California
Census-designated places in Tehama County, California